Lussick is a surname. Notable people with the surname include:

Darcy Lussick (born 1989), Australian rugby league player 
Freddy Lussick (born 2000), New Zealander rugby league player
Richard Lussick (born 1940), Samoan judge